A population cycle in zoology is a phenomenon where populations rise and fall over a predictable period of time. There are some species where population numbers have reasonably predictable patterns of change although the full reasons for population cycles is one of the major unsolved ecological problems. There are a number of factors which influence population change such as availability of food, predators, diseases and climate.

Occurrence in mammal populations
Olaus Magnus, the Archbishop of Uppsala in central Sweden, identified that species of northern rodents had periodic peaks in population and published two reports on the subject in the middle of the 16th century.

In North America, the phenomenon was identified in populations of the snowshoe hare. In 1865, trappers with the Hudson's Bay Company were catching plenty of animals. By 1870, they were catching very few. It was finally identified that the cycle of high and low catches ran over approximately a ten-year period.

The most well known example of creatures which have a population cycle is the lemming. The biologist Charles Sutherland Elton first identified in 1924 that the lemming had regular cycles of population growth and decline. When their population outgrows the resources of their habitat, lemmings migrate, although contrary to popular myth, they do not jump into the sea.

Mouse plagues in Australia happen at intervals of about four years.

Other species
While the phenomenon is often associated with rodents, it does occur in other species such as the ruffed grouse. There are other species which have irregular population explosions such as grasshoppers where overpopulation results in locust swarms in Africa and Australia.

Relationships between predators and prey

There is also an interaction between prey with periodic cycles and predators. As the population expands, there is more food available for predators. As it contracts, there is less food available for predators, putting pressure on their population numbers.

Length

Each population cycle tends to last as long as a species' life expectancy (i.e. lemmings, rabbits and locusts)

See also
 Population dynamics

References

Online references
 Hutchinson Encyclopaedia article
 University of Minnesota Extension Service article on wildlife populations containing a section on population cycles
 Paper by Baltensweiler, W. & Fischlin, A., 1988. The larch bud moth in the Alps

Other references
 Encyclopædia Britannica Online 25 August 2005 "Population Ecology" article section on Population Cycles
Errki Korpimaki and Charles J Krebs "Predation and Population Cycles of Small Mammals" Bioscience November 1996  Volume 46, Number 10

Further reading

 Alan Berryman, Population Cycles, Oxford University Press US, 2002 

Population